Oxydesmidae is a family of millipedes belonging to the order Polydesmida.

Species

Genera:
 Adontodesmus Silvestri, 1897
 Allocotoproctus Hoffman, 1990
 Amurus Attems, 1909

References

Polydesmida